Nasty is a live album released by the funk group Cameo in 1996. In addition to the live material, two new studio tracks were included: "Come Fly With Me" and the album's title track, both written by Larry Blackmon. The "Mega-Mix" is a remix of the album's live tracks. The new studio tracks on this release were the only newly written material released by the band for the next five albums.

Track listing
 "Intro" – 1:03
 "Flirt" – 1:36 - Blackmon, Jenkins
 "She's Strange" – 2:37 - Blackmon, Jenkins, Leftenant, Singleton
 "Back and Forth" – 5:54 - Blackmon, Jenkins, Kendrick, Leftenant
 "Skin I'm In" – 5:09 - Blackmon  	  
 "Why Have I Lost You" – 6:10 - Blackmon  	  
 "Sparkle" – 4:23 - Blackmon, Lockett
 "Candy" – 4:45 - Blackmon, Jenkins
 "Shake Your Pants" (Intro) – 0:42
 "Shake Your Pants" – 4:00 - Blackmon
 "I Just Want to Be" – 1:38 - Blackmon, Johnson
 "Keep It Hot" – 5:12 - Blackmon, Lockett
 "Word Up!" – 6:44 - Blackmon, Jenkins
 "Come Fly With Me" – 3:57 - Blackmon
 "Nasty" – 3:44 - Blackmon
 "Mega-Mix" – 6:27 - Cameo

References

Cameo (band) albums
1996 live albums